IOOF Lodge Building, also known as the Peacock Building, is a historic building located at Marlinton, Pocahontas County, West Virginia. It was built in 1905, and is a two-story, rectangular frame Italianate style commercial building.  It measures approximately 106 feet by 56 feet.  The first floor has two storefronts and the second floor has the Independent Order of Odd Fellows Lodge 102 / Modern Woodmen of America (Pocahontas Marlinton Camp No. 5992) meeting hall.  The lodges continued to use the building until it was sold in 1999.

It was listed on the National Register of Historic Places in 2000.

References

Buildings and structures completed in 1905
Buildings and structures in Pocahontas County, West Virginia
Clubhouses on the National Register of Historic Places in West Virginia
Italianate architecture in West Virginia
Odd Fellows buildings in West Virginia
National Register of Historic Places in Pocahontas County, West Virginia
1905 establishments in West Virginia